is one of the mountains in the Hokusetsu Mountains and is a part of Hokusetsu Natural Park, located in Nose, Ōsaka, Japan.

Gallery

References

Kenpisan